Ogunquit is a resort town in York County, Maine. As of the 2020 census, its population was 1,577. 

Ogunquit is part of the Portland–South Portland–Biddeford, Maine Metropolitan Statistical Area.

History 

Ogunquit, which means "beautiful place by the sea" in the indigenous Abenaki language, was first a village within Wells, which was settled in 1641. The first sawmill was established in 1686, and shipbuilding developed along the tidal Ogunquit River. Local shipwrights built schooners, brigs and dories.

At what was then called Fish Cove, near the unnavigable Josias River, fishing was a major livelihood. But the cove was unprotected by a headland or breakwater from Atlantic storms, so fishermen had to protect their boats by hauling them ashore each night. Resolving to create a safe anchorage, they formed the Fish Cove Harbor Association, and dug a channel across land they purchased to connect Fish Cove with the Josias River. When the trench was complete, erosion helped to further widen the passage. The resulting tidewater basin is called Perkins Cove, spanned by a manually operated draw footbridge. With a three and a half-mile beach of pale sand and dunes forming a barrier peninsula, connected to the mainland in 1888 by bridge across the Ogunquit River, the village was discovered by artists. It became a popular art colony and tourist area. Particularly after 1898, when the Ogunquit Art Colony was established, it was not unusual to see both artists and fishermen working around Perkins Cove. To accommodate summer crowds, several seaside hotels and inns were built. Marginal Way, a scenic trail dating back to the 1920s, runs along the coast from Perkins Cove to Ogunquit Beach. Ogunquit seceded from Wells in 1980 and incorporated as a town. Ogunquit was named America's Best Coastal Small Town in USA Today's 10 Best Readers' Choice 2016.

Ogunquit is a destination for LGBT tourists, with numerous LGBT-owned and -operated hotels, restaurants, bars, theaters, and other businesses. Most of the LGBT-oriented businesses are in the village area of the town.

A July 2016 article in Bloomberg News cited Ogunquit as one of several Maine coastal destinations being visited by "trendsetters and gentrifiers".

In 2023, Tripadvisor ranked Ogunquit Beach as among the United States' top 10 beaches.

Education

The Wells-Ogunquit Community School District provides education for students of all ages in the coastal southern Maine towns of Wells and Ogunquit.

Geography
Ogunquit is drained by the Josias and Ogunquit Rivers. The highest elevation in town is just over 160 feet (49 m) above sea level, in several locations. The lowest elevation is sea level, along the Atlantic Ocean coastline.

Acidic, stony-loam or sandy-loam glacial till soils of the Lyman series underlie most of Ogunquit. There also are outwash sands of the Adams or Croghan series. All of these soils have classic podzol profile development in undisturbed areas.

Ogunquit's Marginal Way, a 1.25-mile (2 km) trail with views of the coast, is neatly paved, and the treacherous cliffs are, in places, fenced. The path leads from the downtown shopping area to the fishing village in Perkins Cove, now an outdoor mall with jewelry, clothing, and candle boutiques.

Climate
This climatic region is typified by large seasonal temperature differences, with warm to hot (and often humid) summers and cold (sometimes severely cold) winters. According to the Köppen Climate Classification system, Ogunquit has a humid continental climate, abbreviated "Dfb" on climate maps.

Demographics

As of 2000 the median income for a household in the town was $47,727, and the median income for a family was $56,731. Males had a median income of $44,583 versus $31,528 for females. The per capita income for the town was $34,289. About 1.2% of families and 4.2% of the population were below the poverty line, including 4.6% of those under age 18 and 3.7% of those age 65 or over.

2010 census
As of the census of 2010, there were 892 people, 498 households, and 234 families residing in the town. The racial makeup of the town was 97.0% White, 0.1% African American, 0.1% Native American, 1.0% Asian, 0.4% from other races, and 1.3% from two or more races. Hispanic or Latino of any race were 1.5% of the population.

There were 498 households, of which 8.6% had children under the age of 18 living with them, 42.0% were married couples living together, 4.0% had a female householder with no husband present, 1.0% had a male householder with no wife present, and 53.0% were non-families. Of all households, 41.2% were made up of individuals, and 20.9% had someone living alone who was 65 years of age or older. The average household size was 1.79 and the average family size was 2.37.

The median age in the town was 61.7 years. Of the residents, 7.6% were under the age of 18; 2.5% were between the ages of 18 and 24; 13.6% were from 25 to 44; 34% were from 45 to 64; and 42.4% were 65 years of age or older. The gender makeup of the town was 50.1% male and 49.9% female.

Cultural sites and museums

 Barn Gallery | Ogunquit Art Association (est 1928) 
 Historical Society of Wells and Ogunquit (1862) (located in Wells)
 Ogunquit Museum of American Art
 Ogunquit Playhouse
 Captain James Winn House
Ogunquit Memorial Library

Notable people 

 Clarence H. Adams, commissioner of the U.S. Securities and Exchange Commission and President of the Boston Celtics
 Marjorie Agosín, award-winning poet, essayist, novelist, and professor at Wellesley College
 Edward H. and Gladys G. Aschermann, early 20th century designers; they resided in Ogunquit and designed the interior of the old Ogunquit Playhouse
 John Kendrick Bangs, author
 Bobby Coombs, Major League Baseball pitcher
 Joseph B. Davol, marine painter and art teacher
 Nathan Haskell Dole, author
 Totie Fields, actress/comedian
 Arnie Ginsburg, radio personality
 Peter George Olenchuk, U.S. Army Major General
 J. Scott Smart, radio, film and stage actor
 Sally Struthers, actress
 Craig Timberlake, stage actor, singer, author, and educator
 John Grimes Walker, admiral in the United States Navy
 Charles Herbert Woodbury, artist

Images

Trivia
Ogunquit Beach is the name of a geologic unit on Mars which was once underwater or on the shore of an ancient lake.

Part of Stephen King's The Stand, published in 1978, is set in Ogunquit. The first episode of the 2020 miniseries adaptation is set in the town, though the series was filmed in Vancouver.

References

External links

 Town of Ogunquit, Maine – Official Website
 Charles H. Woodbury & the Ogunquit School of Art
 Maine Genealogy: Ogunquit, York County, Maine

 
1641 establishments in the Thirteen Colonies
Articles containing video clips
Gay villages in the United States
Populated coastal places in Maine
Populated places established in 1641
Portland metropolitan area, Maine
Towns in York County, Maine
Resort towns